Carlo Romanatti (27 October 1910 – 12 February 1975) was an Italian racing cyclist. He rode in the 1937 Tour de France.

References

External links
 

1910 births
1975 deaths
Italian male cyclists
Place of birth missing
Cyclists from the Province of Como